Fali, or Fali of Mubi after the local city, is a Chadic dialect cluster spoken in Nigeria, in Adamawa State in the Mubi North and Michika LGAs. It is one of several languages in the area that go by the generic name Fali.

Varieties
Varieties are:

Ɓween (Bagira). Autonyms Uramɓween (language), Cumɓween (people)
Huli (Bahuli). Autonyms Urahuli (language), Huli, Hul (people)
Madzarin (Muchalla). Autonyms Ura Madzarin (language), Madzarin (people)
Vin (Vimtim). Autonyms Uroovin (language), Uvin (people)

Notes 

Languages of Nigeria
Biu-Mandara languages